Nikki Ziering (born August 9, 1971) is an American model and actress. Ziering was Playboy's Playmate of the Month for September 1997.

Early life
Ziering was born Natalie Schieler in Norwalk, California. She is of Norwegian and German descent.

Career
Ziering was Playboy's Playmate of the Month for September 1997. She appeared on the cover twice, first in August 1997, then in July 2003, along with a feature pictorial. Prior to Playboy, Ziering was a swimwear model usually modeling for Venus Swimwear and Frederick's of Hollywood. She appeared as a Barker's Beauty on The Price Is Right from 1999 to 2002.

Her television work includes the reality television series Celebrity Love Island, I'm a Celebrity...Get Me Out of Here!, Celebrity Paranormal Project, and Hulk Hogan's Celebrity Championship Wrestling; being a sideline reporter for the CBS tournament blackjack series Ultimate Blackjack Tour; and co-hosting the comedy show The Grill with Vernon Kay. She has also appeared on The Howard Stern Show, and she was the team captain of the 2004 Los Angeles Temptation squad for the Lingerie Bowl. Her work in film includes American Wedding, National Lampoon's Spring Break, and National Lampoon's Gold Diggers.

Personal life
Schieler converted to Judaism before marrying actor Ian Ziering on July 4, 1997. They divorced in 2002.

With then-boyfriend Rick Reynolds, she has a daughter, Tatum Ella Reynolds, born March 27, 2009.

Partial filmography
 Austin Powers in Goldmember (2002)
 Serving Sara (2002)
 American Wedding (2003)
 National Lampoon's Gold Diggers (2003)
 Standing Still (2005)
 National Lampoon's Spring Break (2007)
 Crazy Girls Undercover (2008)
 American High School (2009)

References

External links

 

1971 births
American film actresses
Converts to Judaism
Game show models
Jewish American actresses
Legends Football League players
Living people
American people of German descent
American people of Norwegian descent
People from Greater Los Angeles
1990s Playboy Playmates
People from Norwalk, California
Actresses from California
21st-century American Jews
21st-century American women